Boys Town is Nasty Idols fifth album release after 2002's Heroes for Sale. It is largely seen as a return to the sound that made them well known in Sweden with their albums Cruel Intention and Vicious. It is the band's first album with drummer Rikki Dahl, who replaced Stanley in the band's recent tours.

Track listing

Personnel
 Andy Pierce - vocals, acoustic guitar
 Peter Espinoza - lead guitar
 Dick Qwarfort - bass
 Rikki Dahl - drums
 Matti Engdahl - keyboards and strings on "Nite Like This" and "It Ain't Easy"

Production
 Andy Pierce - producer
 Matti Engdahl - producer, engineer, mastering

References

2009 albums
Nasty Idols albums